The Texas Cave Conservancy was formed on October 13, 1994. This non-member, non-profit, 501 (c) (3) Texas corporation is dedicated to the protection of caves, cave life, and aquifers as related to caves. The TCC works through public education, scientific research and cave management by assisting land developers, municipalities, other non-profit organizations and private landowners in the protection and management of caves.

The TCC manages fifty cave preserves in the Austin, Texas area. Over one hundred and fifty caves are protected.

On July 16, 2015, the TCC Board of Directors voted to close the organization after 21 years.

External links
 Texas Cave Conservancy Website

Organizations based in Austin, Texas
Cave conservancies
Environmental organizations based in Texas